Chusquea elata is a species of bamboo endemic to Ecuador.

References

elata
Endemic flora of Ecuador
Grasses of South America
Endangered flora of South America
Taxonomy articles created by Polbot
Taxobox binomials not recognized by IUCN